The 2022 V.League 2, known as the LS V.League 2 for sponsorship reasons, was the 28th season of V.League 2, Vietnam's second tier professional football league. The season started on 5 March 2022.

Changes from the previous season
All 13 teams from the 2021 season were expected to return as no teams were promoted or relegated from the previous season due to the COVID-19 pandemic. However, An Giang withdrew after being unable to secure a financial sponsor for the season.

From V.League 2
Dissolved
 An Giang

Clubs

Stadium and locations

Personnel and kits

Managerial changes

League table

Results

Season statistics

Top scorers

Source: Soccerway

Hat-tricks

Clean sheets

Awards

Annual awards

Attendances to stadium

References

External links
 Official Page

V.League 2
Vietnam
2022 in Vietnamese football